A by-election for the constituency of Edmonton in the United Kingdom House of Commons was held on 13 November 1948, caused by the death of the incumbent Labour MP Evan Durbin. The result was a hold for the Labour Party, with their candidate Austen Albu winning with a significantly reduced majority of 3,327.

Result

Previous election

References

 Craig, F. W. S. (1983) [1969]. British parliamentary election results 1918-1949 (3rd edition ed.). Chichester: Parliamentary Research Services. . 
 

Edmonton,1948
Edmonton by-election
Edmonton by-election
20th century in Middlesex
Edmonton,1948
Edmonton by-election